Scott of Kinghorn was a shipbuilding company at Kinghorn near Burntisland, Fife, Scotland.

Background
The company was founded as J Scott and Company and was trading by the 1870s. Its products included paddle ferries for the Firth of Forth. By the 1900s Scott owned an engine works that built triple-expansion engines for large steamships. The company suffered a trade slump in the Edwardian era and ceased production in 1909.

Ships built
Birkenhead (1894)
Scottish Maid (1899)
Lady Evelyn (1900)
Ebenezer (1903)
Duranbah (1905)
TSS Kempsey (1907)
 (1907)
Eumeralla (1908)

References

Further reading

Companies based in Fife
Manufacturing companies disestablished in 1909
Defunct shipbuilding companies of Scotland
1909 disestablishments in Scotland
1870s establishments in Scotland
British companies disestablished in 1909